Pieter Daneel (born 19 March 1987 in Stellenbosch) is a South African cricketer and businessman.

Daneel was educated at Paul Roos Gymnasium in Stellenbosch and Stellenbosch University. He played in the 2006 U-19 Cricket World Cup in Sri Lanka. In 2006–07, he played first-class and List A cricket for Boland.

Daneel worked in banking as a chartered accountant in Johannesburg and London before taking charge of his family's jewellery manufacturing business in Cape Town. He gained a Professor Jochen Runde Scholarship to study for an MBA at Jesus College, Cambridge in 2019–20. He played for Cambridge University in the 2020 University match, scoring a century in the second innings.

References

External links
 

1987 births
Living people
South African cricketers
Boland cricketers
Lions cricketers
Alumni of Paul Roos Gymnasium
Stellenbosch University alumni
Alumni of Jesus College, Cambridge
Cambridge University cricketers
People from Stellenbosch
Cricketers from the Western Cape